The following is a list of pipeline accidents in the United States in 1970. It is one of several lists of U.S. pipeline accidents. See also: list of natural gas and oil production accidents in the United States.

Incidents 

This is not a complete list of all pipeline accidents. For natural gas alone, the Pipeline and Hazardous Materials Safety Administration (PHMSA), a United States Department of Transportation agency, has collected data on more than 3,200 accidents deemed serious or significant since 1987.

A "significant incident" results in any of the following consequences:
 Fatality or injury requiring in-patient hospitalization.
 $50,000 or more in total costs, measured in 1984 dollars.
 Liquid releases of five or more barrels (42 US gal/barrel).
 Releases resulting in an unintentional fire or explosion.

PHMSA and the National Transportation Safety Board (NTSB) post-incident data and results of investigations into accidents involving pipelines that carry a variety of products, including natural gas, oil, diesel fuel, gasoline, kerosene, jet fuel, carbon dioxide, and other substances. Occasionally pipelines are re-purposed to carry different products.

The following incidents occurred during 1970:
On January 11, a home exploded in Bowling Green, Kentucky, killing a man. Contractor damage to a gas line was suspected.
On January 17, workers from Buckeye Partners ignited a fire to burn off petroleum from a leaking pipeline near Warren, Ohio. The fire grew out of control for several hours, requiring 100 fire-fighters to help contain the blaze. One pipeline employee was injured.
On January 24, a leaking 2-inch natural gas main exploded in Houma, Louisiana, killing two gas company workers, one firefighter, injuring 28 others, and demolishing half a block of downtown buildings. The workers were attempting to repair the gas line.
On February 5, a jet fuel pipeline leaked, and contaminated 50 to 60 acres of farm and pasture land near Lakeland, Florida. Some wildlife was killed, and a small fire broke out in the fuel.
On April 19, an 8-inch pipeline broke near Wauseon, Ohio, spilling Number 2 fuel oil into the Maumee River, and endangering the water supply for several cities for a time.
On July 15, a 30-inch welded gas pipeline rolled into the trench and killed 20-year-old Art Greminger who had only been working since July 12. He was employed by a contractor out of Cape Girardeau, Missouri, laying the pipeline for Mississippi River Fuel Transmission Co., in more recent years called Center Point Energy.
Early on September 2, residents of Jacksonville, Maryland, detected gasoline odors and noticed gasoline in a small creek flowing beneath a nearby road. Because fumes were still present in the late afternoon of September 2, a resident notified Colonial Pipeline at 6:19 p.m. about the situation. About 12 hours later, on the morning of September 3, an explosion and fire occurred in a ditch in which contractor personnel for Colonial were manually digging to further expose the pipeline and catch gasoline trickling from the ground. Five persons were injured, none fatally. The NTSB later pointed out that workers had failed to use a flammable vapor percent detector during the work. The leak point was found four days later. The failure resulted in a release of 30,186 gallons (718 barrels) of gasoline and kerosene.
On September 7, a pipeline leaked thousands of gallons of gasoline onto farmland near Ontario, Oregon. Roads were closed in the area until the gasoline was removed.
On December 9, a Phillips Petroleum Company propane pipeline leaked, in Franklin County, Missouri, causing the 1970 propane vapor cloud explosion in Port Hudson. The leak led to a propane cloud explosion, with a force estimated up to 50 tons of TNT. The NTSB cited past external and internal corrosion issues, and poor welds on the uncoated pipeline as concerns.
In December, the explosion of a 30-inch 1100 psi inlet natural gas pipeline, bringing offshore natural gas into a gas-drying plant in southern Louisiana. Two plant personnel were killed. Rupture was at a junction of a 12-inch gas line to the 30-inch main line.
On December 11, a restaurant owner opened a gas line valve in New York, New York, not knowing that part of the gas line was open and unconnected. The gas in the building exploded, killing fifteen people, and injuring more than 60 others.
On December 17, a Mid-Valley pipeline leaked, spilling 250,000 gallons of crude oil onto that companies' land in Dayton, Ohio. There were no injuries or fire.
On December 28, a 12-inch pipeline ruptured in Jackson, Wisconsin, spilling  of fuel oil into a wildlife sanctuary.

References

Lists of pipeline accidents in the United States
pipeline accidents
1970 in the environment
1970 in the United States